María Marcelina Rebeca Silva Cosío (26 April 1925 – 7 May 2002), known as Rebeca or Rebeca Silva Cosío, was a Mexican singer who was the last official vocalist of songwriter and pianist Agustín Lara. She also introduced and recorded Lara's final songs.

She recorded her first album, Señora tentación, in 1959 and won a gold record in 1961. She was one of RCA Victor exclusive artists, and her records were best sellers in Mexico in the 1960s. She recorded her final album, Rebeca interpreta a Agustín Lara, in the 1970s for the Orfeón label.

Discography 
 Señora tentación
 Canciones de Agustín Lara
 Rebeca y sus compositores predilectos
 Enamorada
 Canciones inolvidables
 Estrella solitaria
 Nacida para amar...
 El disco de oro de Rebeca
 Rebeca interpreta a Agustín Lara

References

External links 
 Nostalgia: Rebeca interpreta a Agustín Lara in AllMusic
 "Rebeca... La Voz de Terciopelo", article written by Rebeca Cerrato Silva for Música sin final

1925 births
2002 deaths
Bolero singers
RCA Victor artists
Singers from Mexico City
20th-century Mexican women singers